The Microregion of Birigui is located on the northwest of São Paulo state, Brazil, and is made up of 18 municipalities. It belongs to the Mesoregion of Araçatuba.

The population of the Microregion is 257,531 inhabitants, in an area of 4,510.9 km²

Municipalities 
The microregion consists of the following municipalities, listed below with their 2010 Census populations (IBGE/2010):

Alto Alegre: 4,102
Avanhandava: 11,310
Barbosa: 6,593
Bilac: 7,048
Birigui: 108,728
Braúna: 5,021
Brejo Alegre: 2,573
Buritama: 15,418
Clementina: 7,065
Coroados: 5,238
Gabriel Monteiro: 2,708
Glicério: 4,565
Lourdes: 2,128
Luiziânia: 5,030
Penápolis: 58,510
Piacatu: 5,287
Santópolis do Aguapeí: 4,277
Turiúba: 1,930

References

Birigui